Richard Dalby (1949–2017) was an English editor and literary researcher.

Richard or Ric(k) Dalby may also refer to:

Richard Dalby (MP) (died before 1455), English Member of Parliament
Rick Dalby (fl. 2000s), nominee for Hollywood Post Alliance Award for Outstanding Color Grading – Television
Ric Dalby, fictional character from Home and Away

See also
Richard Dalby Morkill, mayor of Sherbrooke, Quebec